Wahlquist is a surname. Notable people with the surname include:

Åsa Wahlquist, Australian journalist
Heather Wahlquist (born 1977), American actress
Hege Bakken Wahlquist (born 1992), Norwegian handball player

See also
Wallquist (disambiguation)

Surnames of Swedish origin